Oleh Borysovych Koshelyuk (born 7 September 1969) is a Ukrainian professional football coach and a former player. He works as children's coach with DYuFK Odesa.

He made his professional debut in the Soviet Second League in 1986 for FC Shakhtar Pavlohrad. He played 4 games in the UEFA Intertoto Cup 1997 for FC Torpedo-Luzhniki Moscow.

Honours
 Soviet Top League champion: 1988.
 Soviet Cup winner: 1989 (played in the early stages of the 1988/89 tournament for FC Dnipro Dnipropetrovsk).
 Ukrainian Premier League bronze: 1992, 1993.
 Ukrainian Cup winner: 1992.

References

External links
 
 

1969 births
Living people
Sportspeople from Lviv
Soviet footballers
Association football midfielders
Association football forwards
Ukrainian footballers
Ukrainian expatriate footballers
Soviet Top League players
Soviet Second League players
Russian Premier League players
Ukrainian Premier League players
Ukrainian Second League players
Ukrainian Amateur Football Championship players
FC Shakhtar Pavlohrad players
FC Dnipro players
SC Odesa players
FC Chornomorets Odesa players
FC Tyras-2500 Bilhorod-Dnistrovskyi players
FC Ivan Odesa players
FC Dnipro Cherkasy players
FC Real Pharma Odesa players
Beitar Jerusalem F.C. players
Hapoel Haifa F.C. players
Hapoel Rishon LeZion F.C. players
Hapoel Beit She'an F.C. players
Expatriate footballers in Israel
Ukrainian expatriate sportspeople in Israel
FC Kyzylzhar players
FC Torpedo Moscow players
FC Torpedo-2 players
FC Mariupol players
Ukrainian football managers
FC Yenisey Krasnoyarsk players